Love in a Sleeper is the final studio album released by German euro-disco group Silver Convention, which at the time consisted of vocalists Ramona Wulf, Rhonda Heath and Zenda Jacks. The album managed to chart in the RPM 's disco album chart, peaking #11. The single Spend The Night With Me peaked #80 in the Billboard R&B Singles chart, #10 in Dance Music/Club Play Singles and #12 in Canadian Dance Chart.

Track listing

Side A
 "Love In A Sleeper" - 5:33
 "Mission To Venus" - 4:24
 "Take Me, Shake Me, Wake Me" - 3:50
 "Get It Up" - 5:00

Side B
 "Acuestate Conmigo" - 4:27 * lead vocals Ramona Wulf. 
 "Spend The Night With Me" - 4:28
 "City In The Sun" - 3:15
 "Breakfast In Bed" - 3:48

Weekly charts

References 

1978 albums
Silver Convention albums